Thomas of Savoy may refer to:
Thomas I, Count of Savoy, first Thomas to rule Savoy
Thomas II of Piedmont, second Thomas to rule Savoy (as regent)
Thomas III of Piedmont
Thomas Francis, Prince of Carignano, of the House of Savoy